The Port of Zhuhai is the port of the prefecture-level city of Zhuhai, on the west side of the Pearl River estuary in the Chinese province of Guangdong. The Port of Zhuhai is composed of seven main port areas: Gaolan, Wanshan, Jiuzhou, Xiangzhou, Tangjia, Hongwan and Doumen.   The main areas are the Jiuzhou Port Area to the east of the city, and the Gaolan Port Area to the west. As of 2012, the port had 131 berths, 126 production berths, of which 17 were deep-water berths over 10,000DWT.

The volume of port traffic and urban population make Zhuhai a medium-port metropolis according to the Southampton system of port-city classification.

The Jiujiang Port Area includes a container terminal and a terminal for high-speed ferries connecting Zhuhai with Shenzhen in mainland China and Hong Kong. It is also developing into a transport hub with regular coach services connecting the port with various cities west of the Pearl River such as Jiangmen and Shunde.

Ticketed passengers on flights going to and from Hong Kong International Airport may take ferries from the Zhuhai Ferry Terminal to the HKIA Skypier.

History and Geography

Providing container and general cargo handling services, ZICT(J) operates five multi-purpose berths.

On 10 July 2007, a new ferry service between Jiuzhou port and Skypier in Hong Kong International Airport began. The new service was to have two roundtrip sailings per day and can carry 1,300 passengers, with ferries departing Jiuzhou at 9:30 am and 3:30 pm and leaving the airport at 11:15 am and 5 pm. There were plant to increase frequency to three roundtrip sailings daily by August and four daily by January 2008.

In Spring 2009, refurbishment of the port was completed, with new stores and other facilities for passengers.

Layout and Facilities

Ferry timetable

Hong Kong China Ferry Terminal

Source: CKSP company website

Hong Kong Macau Ferry Terminal

Source: CKSP website

Hong Kong International Airport

Source: CKSP company website

Forward travel from JiuZhou Port
JiuZhou Port is connected by a number of other on-going transport options.

Taxis are available.

After a busy ferry has come in, it might be necessary to queue and wait for taxis to return. To the right of the port on the sea wall-lined pavement is a bus stop for buses headed north. The number 99 directly passes the famous "Fisher Girl" statue (symbol of Zhuhai), and has views of the surrounding islands.

Opposite the port is a larger bus terminus where a number of buses run regular services. From here the number 3 restarts its route and heads North past Zhongshan University and Beijing Normal University, Zhuhai Campus, all the way up to Jin Ding. Many other bus routes lead down into the Gongbei section of Zhuhai,  where the China / Macau Border Crossing is located.

See also
 Chu Kong Passenger Transport Co., Ltd

References

Zhuhai
Pearl River Delta
Ports and harbours of China